Nena feat. Nena, also known as 20 Jahre Das Jubiläums-Album (20 Years The Anniversary Album) is a studio album by German pop singer Nena. It contains new versions of her hits, some of them are duets with other singers, including Kim Wilde, Joachim Witt and Udo Lindenberg. The album was first released in 2002 with a red cover and reissued with a blue cover in 2003. Both releases exist in either standard or limited edition, the latter being supplemented with a bonus CD of live tracks. The songs on the bonus CD are also reworked, suggesting that Nena may have planned to update more of her back-catalogue, although there have been no further releases in this vein.

Background
Throughout her solo career, Nena had experimented with various styles, culminating in the 2001 technopop Chokmah album which immediately preceded Nena feat. Nena. These had not matched the commercial success of the Nena band albums.  Perhaps less imaginatively, Nena therefore chose to mark the 20th anniversary of the band's debut by recording the Nena feat. Nena album which, as its title implies, comprises updated versions of tracks from Nena's back catalogue with no new material.

12 of the 14 songs on the initial "red cover" version of the album were originally written and released in the 1980s and, with the other two coming from the 2001 Chokmah, Nena's four solo albums in the 1990s are completely unrepresented. The modifications for Nena feat Nena range from applying different tunes (e.g. the versions of "99 Luftballons" and "Nur geträumt") to those with different arrangements, often performed jointly with guest vocalists (such as "Wunder gescheh'n" and "Jetzt bist du weg"). The lyrics are also significantly reworked in some songs, for example "Leuchtturm" and most obviously the English sections for Kim Wilde's parts in "Anyplace, Anywhere, Anytime".

Chart performance
While Nena remained active and popular after the demise of the band in 1987, releasing several albums for adults and children, she was unable to recapture the chart success she enjoyed in the early 1980s. Nena feat. Nena changed that. Nena feat. Nena has sold more than 1.5 million copies worldwide, making it one of the best-selling albums by a German artist in the new millennium. It reestablished Nena as a national icon and international star.

The album's lead single, the new version of "99 Luftballons", was released three weeks before the album. It was not until the release of the second single, the new version of "Leuchtturm", that Nena could repeat the success she had in the 1980s.

Having been absent from the German Top 40 singles charts for 13 years, three of the tracks from this album made the Top 10. (See ).

Aftermath
Although Nena feat. Nena resurrected its creator's career, it remained the case that all Nena's best-selling material had been originally written in the 1980s, virtually all of it by 1986, prior to Nena going solo. It was not until the follow-up studio album in 2005, Willst du mit mir gehn, that Nena finally broke the 1980s' monopoly of her greatest hits and concert favourites. By 2010 Nena's live performances of tracks from the album had all reverted to their original versions, with the exception of "Leuchtturm" (which is a special case, since it is performed as a combination of the original version and the 2002 version, the 2002 version being played after the second chorus).

Track listing

Live DVD releases

A double DVD called Nena feat. Nena Live was released on 24 March 2003. It contains Nena's twentieth anniversary show recorded on 11 October 2002 at Frankfurt am Main. The show ran for nearly three hours, during which Nena invited many friends and fellow musicians to sing along with her: Joachim Witt, Udo Lindenberg, Kim Wilde, Westbam, Markus Mörl, Hartmut Engler, Rosenstolz, Mike Tait, Howard Jones, and TokTok, as well as the surviving members of Nena band: Rolf Brendel, Uwe Fahrenkrog-Petersen and Jürgen Dehmel. The second DVD contains footage of Nena and her band on tour, interviews, and music videos for the new versions of the songs.

On 26 May 2003, an abridged audio-only version of the same concert was released as one DVD-Audio disc.

DVD video track listing
DVD 1

 Haus der drei Sonnen
 Satellitenstadt
 Tanz auf dem Vulkan
 Oldschool Baby (featuring Westbam)
 Carpe Diem
 Wunder gescheh'n 2002 (featuring Joachim Witt)
 Kleine Taschenlampe brenn (featuring Markus)
 Lichtarbeiter 2002
 Silbermond
 Es regnet 2002
 Lass mich dein Pirat sein 2002 (featuring Hartmut Engler)
 Jetzt bist du weg 2002 (featuring Udo Lindenberg)
 Dafür ist das Leben zu kurz
 ? (Fragezeichen) 2002
 Du kennst die Liebe nicht (featuring Rosenstolz)
 What Is Love? (featuring Howard Jones)
 Anyplace, Anywhere, Anytime (featuring Kim Wilde)
 Leuchtturm (Old Version) (featuring Rolf Brendel, Uwe Fahrenkrog-Petersen and Jürgen Dehmel)
 Rette Mich
 Ganz Oben
 Nur Geträumt 2002

DVD 2

 99 Luftballons 2002
 99 Luftballons
 Irgendwie, irgendwo, irgendwann
 Vollmond 2002
 Manchmal ist ein Tag ein ganzes Leben
 Ich umarm die ganze Welt
 Ruby Tuesday (featuring Mike Tait)
 No Expectations
 Zusammen
 Der Anfang vom Ende
 Bang Bang (featuring TokTok)
 ? (Fragezeichen) 2002
 Credits and Outro

Charts

Weekly charts

Year-end charts

References

External links
 
 
 
 

Nena albums
Vocal duet albums
2003 live albums
2002 greatest hits albums
2003 video albums
Live video albums
German-language albums
Warner Music Group albums